Sergei Nikolayevich Ignashevich (born 14 July 1979) is a Russian professional football coach and a former player who played as central defender. He is the manager of Baltika Kaliningrad.

He began his career at Torpedo Moscow, going up through the club's academy before briefly moving to twin club Spartak Moscow's academy and then starting his professional career with Spartak Orekhovo.

He played for Lokomotiv Moscow and CSKA Moscow in his career, and has won Russian Premier League titles for both clubs, as well as the 2005 UEFA Cup Final with CSKA. Ignashevich is often considered one of the highest skilled defenders in the Russian Premier League while playing alongside fellow Russian international defenders and twin brothers Aleksei and Vasili Berezutskiy.

He made his international debut for Russia in 2002, and was selected in their squads for two European Championships and two FIFA World Cups, helping them to the semi-finals of UEFA Euro 2008, earning his 100th cap at the 2014 FIFA World Cup, and as part of the host team reached the quarter-finals of the 2018 FIFA World Cup. On 8 September 2015, he made his 110th international appearance and became the most capped player in Russia's team history, overtaking Viktor Onopko. On 17 November 2015, he made his 114th appearance, making him the most capped Russian player for any national team (again, overtaking Onopko who played 4 additional games for CIS).

On 2 April 2017, he played his 457th game in the Russian Premier League, setting a new record for most games played in the competition and overtaking the previous record holder Sergei Semak. He held the record for most games played in the Russian first tier with 489, until he was overtaken by his former teammate Igor Akinfeev on 21 August 2021.

Club career
After short spells with Spartak Orekhovo and Krylia Sovetov, Ignashevich joined Lokomotiv Moscow in 2001. In his first season with the capital club, the defender was part of the team which won the Russian Cup. A year later, Lokomotiv won the Russian league title.

In 2004, Ignashevich left Lokomotiv for city rivals CSKA. In his twelve years with the club, Ignashevich has won the 2005, 2006 and 2013 league titles, 2005, 2006, 2008, 2009 and 2013 Russian Cups, and the 2004–05 UEFA Cup.

Both Ignashevich and Aleksei Berezutskiy were provisionally suspended after both players' A samples revealed the presence of a prohibited substance following a random doping test after CSKA's UEFA Champions League match at Manchester United on 3 November 2009. It was later revealed that they had taken a cold medicine which had not been reported, and both players were suspended for one game, which was applied retroactively.

Following retirement after the 2018 World Cup, Ignashevich chose to remain with CSKA as a coach, specifically working within the youth set up at the club.

International career

Ignashevich made his debut for the Russia national football team against Sweden on 21 August 2002. He started all ten of the team's UEFA Euro 2004 qualifying matches, scoring three times, but missed the tournament finals in Portugal due to injury. He later appeared for Russia at the 2008 and 2012 UEFA European Championships, helping the team to the semi-finals in the former.

On 2 June 2014, Ignashevich was included in Russia's 2014 FIFA World Cup squad. On 16 June, he made his FIFA World Cup debut in the team's first group match against South Korea. He was then named in the starting line-up for the second match against Belgium  at the Maracanã on 22 June. He became only the second Russian, after Viktor Onopko, to earn his 100th cap, in the final group game against Algeria on 26 June in Curitiba. Russia drew 1–1 and their opponents advanced at their expense.

Ignashevich came out of international retirement prior to the 2018 FIFA World Cup as he was called up on 14 May 2018 to replace injured Ruslan Kambolov. On 3 June 2018, he was included in the finalized World Cup squad. He was one of only four players born in the 1970s to feature in the tournament, with the others being Tim Cahill (Australia), Rafael Márquez (Mexico) and Essam El Hadary (Egypt). Against Spain in the Round of Sixteen, he scored an own-goal while tangling with Sergio Ramos during a corner set-piece, but Russia would equalize thanks to a penalty, and in the shoot-out Ignashevich converted his spot kick to help Russia advance. Following Russia's elimination in the 2018 FIFA World Cup quarterfinal against Croatia after extra time ended deadlocked 2–2, where he successfully converted a shoot-out kick, Ignashevich announced his retirement from all forms of football.

Coaching career
After finishing his playing career, Ignashevich was appointed as administrator for the Under-21 squad of CSKA Moscow.

On 4 June 2019, he became the manager of Torpedo Moscow, a few days after the club was promoted to the Football National League. On 22 March 2021, he left Torpedo by mutual consent.

On 2 October 2021, he was appointed a manager of the Football National League club FC Baltika.

Personal life
Ignashevich is married and has three children. He is of Chuvash and Belarusian origin.

Career statistics

Club

1Includes UEFA Europa League and UEFA Champions League.
2Includes Russian Super Cup, Russian Premier League Cup and UEFA Super Cup.

International

International goals
Scores and results list Russia's goal tally first.

Managerial statistics 
As of 19 March 2023

Honours

Club
Lokomotiv Moscow
Russian Premier League: 2002
Russian Cup: 2001
Russian Super Cup: 2003

CSKA Moscow
Russian Premier League: 2005, 2006, 2012–13, 2013–14, 2015–16
Russian Cup: 2004–05, 2005–06, 2007–08, 2008–09, 2010–11, 2012–13
Russian Super Cup: 2004, 2006, 2007, 2009, 2013, 2014
UEFA Cup: 2004–05

International
Russia
UEFA European Football Championship: 2008 bronze medalist

See also
 List of men's footballers with 100 or more international caps

References

External links

Official website
Profile at CSKA Moscow website (eng)

1979 births
Living people
Footballers from Moscow
Russian footballers
Russian people of Belarusian descent
Russian people of Polish descent
Russia under-21 international footballers
Russia international footballers
PFC Krylia Sovetov Samara players
FC Lokomotiv Moscow players
PFC CSKA Moscow players
UEFA Cup winning players
Russian Premier League players
UEFA Euro 2008 players
UEFA Euro 2012 players
2014 FIFA World Cup players
UEFA Euro 2016 players
FC Znamya Truda Orekhovo-Zuyevo players
Association football central defenders
2018 FIFA World Cup players
FIFA Century Club
Russian football managers
FC Torpedo Moscow managers
FC Baltika Kaliningrad managers